The 1975 Monte Carlo WCT, also known by its sponsored name Marlboro Classic, was a men's tennis tournament played on outdoor clay courts at the Monte Carlo Country Club in Roquebrune-Cap-Martin, France. The tournament was part of the Green Group of the 1975 World Championship Tennis circuit. It was the 70th edition of the event and was held from 23 March through 30 March 1975. Manuel Orantes won the singles title.

Finals

Singles

 Manuel Orantes defeated  Bob Hewitt 6–2, 6–4

Doubles

 Bob Hewitt /  Frew McMillan defeated  Arthur Ashe /  Tom Okker 6–3, 6–2

References

External links
 
 ATP tournament profile
 ITF tournament details

Monte-Carlo Masters
Monte Carlo WCT
Monte Carlo WCT
Monte
Monte Carlo WCT